The Presidential Records Act (PRA) of 1978, is an Act of the United States Congress governing the official records of Presidents and Vice Presidents created or received after January 20, 1981, and mandating the preservation of all presidential records. Enacted November 4, 1978, the PRA changed the legal ownership of the President's official records from private to public, and established a new statutory structure under which Presidents must manage their records. The PRA was amended in 2014, to include the prohibition of sending electronic records through non-official accounts unless an official account is copied on the transmission, or a copy is forwarded to an official account shortly after creation.

History 
The Presidential Records Act was enacted in 1978 after President Richard Nixon sought to destroy records relating to his presidential tenure upon his resignation in 1974. The law superseded the policy in effect during Nixon’s tenure that a president’s records were considered private property, making clear that presidential records are owned by the public. The PRA requires the President to ensure preservation of records documenting the performance of his official duties (44 U.S.C. § 2203(a)), provides for the National Archives and Records Administration (NARA) to take custody and control of the records (44 U.S.C. § 2203(g)), and sets forth a schedule of staged public access to such records (44 U.S.C. § 2204). Records covered by the PRA encompass documentary materials relating to the political activities of the President or members of the President’s staff if they concern or have an effect upon the carrying out of “constitutional, statutory, or other official or ceremonial duties of the President” (44 U.S.C. § 2201(2)).

Provisions
Specifically, the Presidential Records Act:
 Defines and states public ownership of the records.
 Places the responsibility for the custody and management of incumbent presidential records with the President.
 Allows the incumbent president to dispose of records that no longer have administrative, historical, informational, or evidentiary value, once he or she has obtained the views of the Archivist of the United States on the proposed disposal in writing. 
 Establishes a process for restriction and public access to these records. Specifically, the PRA allows for public access to presidential records through the Freedom of Information Act (FOIA) beginning five years after the end of the Administration, but allows the President to invoke as many as six specific restrictions to public access for up to twelve years. The PRA also establishes procedures for Congress, courts, and subsequent administrations to obtain special access to records that remain closed to the public, following a 30‑day notice period to the former and current Presidents.
 Requires that Vice-Presidential records are to be treated in the same way as presidential records.
 Establishes that Presidential records automatically transfer into the legal custody of the Archivist as soon as the President leaves office.  
 Establishes procedures for Congress, courts, and subsequent Administrations to obtain “special access” to records from NARA that remain closed to the public, following a privilege review period by the former and incumbent Presidents; the procedures governing such special access requests continue to be governed by the relevant provisions of E.O. 13489
 Establishes preservation requirements for official business conducted using non-official electronic messaging accounts:  any individual creating Presidential records must not use non-official electronic messaging accounts unless that individual copies an official account as the message is created or forwards a complete copy of the record to an official messaging account. (A similar provision in the Federal Records Act applies to federal agencies.)
 Requires that the President and his staff take all practical steps to file personal records separately from Presidential records.
 Prevents an individual who has been convicted of a crime related to the review, retention, removal, or destruction of records from being given access to any original records.

Related Executive Orders 

 Executive Order 12667 – issued by President Reagan in January 1989, this executive order established the procedures for NARA and former and incumbent Presidents to implement the PRA.
 Executive Order 13233 – this executive order, issued by President George W. Bush on November 1, 2001, superseded Reagan's previous executive order. The Bush executive order also included the documents of former Vice Presidents.
 Executive Order 13489 – issued by President Barack Obama on January 21, 2009, restored the implementation of the PRA of 1978 as practiced under President Reagan's Executive Order 12667 and revoked President Bush's Executive Order 13233.

Proposed amendments
Presidential Records Act Amendments of 2007, passed by the House on March 14, 2007.
Communications Over Various Feeds Electronically for Engagement Act of 2017, named after President Trump's "covfefe" tweet

See also

Records management
Espionage Act of 1917
Presidential and Federal Records Act Amendments of 2014
Bush White House e-mail controversy
FBI investigation into Donald Trump's handling of presidential documents
Joe Biden classified documents incident
Mike Pence classified documents incident

References

External links

 Presidential Records at the U.S. National Archives

1978 in American law
Freedom of information legislation in the United States
Freedom of Information Act (United States)
United States federal government administration legislation
Records Act